Louis Maximilian I of Isenburg-Wächtersbach was a German count of Isenburg-Wächtersbach from 1798 to 1805.  The county itself lasted from 1673 to 1806 in the central Holy Roman Empire, until it was mediated to Isenberg. He was also a descendant of Ferdinand Maximilian I of Isenburg-Wächtersbach.

Ancestry

References

Counts of Isenburg-Wächtersbach
1805 deaths
1741 births